Kristina Sandberg (born 1971) is a Swedish novelist. She won the August Prize in 2014 for the novel Liv till varje pris. In 2014, she was awarded the Moa Award.

Selected bibliography 
Ta itu (novel, 2010)
Att föda ett barn (novel, 2010)
Sörja för de sina (novel, 2012)
Liv till varje pris (novel, 2014)

References 

21st-century Swedish novelists
August Prize winners
1971 births
Living people
Moa Award recipients